Chapayev, Chapaev, Chapayevo, Chapayevsk or Chapayevka may refer to:

 Vasily Chapayev, a Russian soldier and Red Army commander.

Places
Places named after Vasily Chapayev:
in Russia:
Chapayevsk, a city in Samara Oblast
Chapayevka (river) in Samara Oblast
Chapayevo, Republic of Dagestan, a village in Republic of Dagestan
Chapayevo, Olyokminsky District, Sakha Republic, a village in Sakha Republic
Chapaev, Kazakhstan, a town in Akzhaik District, West Kazakhstan Region, Kazakhstan
in Kyrgyzstan:
Chapaev, Osh, a village in Nookat District, Osh Region
Chapaev, Chüy, a village in Chüy District, Chüy Region
Chapaev, Batken, a village in Leylek District, Batken Region

Other
Chapayev (game), a board game
Chapaev (film), a 1934 film
Chapayev-class cruiser, a class of Soviet light cruisers